The Australian Singing Competition (ASC) evolved from the Marianne Mathy Scholarship, established in 1982 through a bequest made in the will of Marianne Mathy-Frisdane, a coloratura soprano opera singer and distinguished teacher of opera and classical singing.

The ASC rules and repertoire requirements are designed for young opera and classical singers, under 26 years of age. The competition is now recognised as one of the longest-running events of its kind, offering a range of scholarships, prizes, career and network opportunities, which also make the competition one of the richest in terms of financial and career opportunities available to recipients. Since 1982 the premier award of the competition has been the Marianne Mathy Scholarship, known by its participants and within its industry as "The Mathy".

Since 1998 the final concert of the competition has taken place in various capital cities around Australia, featuring many prominent conductors and some of Australia's leading orchestras.

The competition has had the patronage of several Governor-Generals of Australia, most recently David Hurley AC DSC (Retd). In 2014 the ASC formally welcomed Haruhisa Handa as patron of the renamed IFAC Handa Australian Singing Competition in recognition of his ongoing sponsorship and support, both personally and as chairman of the International Foundation for Arts and Culture (IFAC).

The winner of the Opera Awards (Australia) is acknowledged and invited to perform as a guest artist at the finals concert of the IFAC Handa Australian Singing Competition.

Marianne Mathy Scholarship winners ("The Mathy") 

The IFAC Handa Australian Singing Competition is managed by Music & Opera Singers Trust Limited.

References

External links 
 
 Music Australia – The Australian Singing Competition, National Library of Australia
 
 Opera Awards (Australia) website
 Music & Opera Singers Trust (MOST) website

Opera competitions
Singing competitions
Music organisations based in Australia
Arts organizations established in 1982
1982 establishments in Australia